Simijaca is a town and municipality in the Ubaté Province, part of the Cundinamarca Department, Colombia. Simijaca borders the Boyacá municipalities Chiquinquirá and Caldas in the north, Susa and Carmen de Carupa in the south, Caldas in the west and San Miguel de Sema in the east.

Etymology 
Simijaca means in the Chibcha language of the Muisca "Blue sky" and "Nose of the white owl".

History 
The area of Simijaca before the Spanish conquest was part of the Muisca Confederation. Initially loyal to the zaque of Hunza, Simijaca changed rule around 1490 when it was submitted by zipa Saguamanchica.

The first Spanish establishment was done by Rodrigo Mexia Serrano on February 26, 1586. However, this population was ephemeral. And when the oidor (judge) Luis Enrique did a visitation, in July 1600, the natives had not populated the town and the entrusted had not built the church. By act on August 14, 1600, carried out by Luis Enríquez & Juan López de Linares in Cucunubá, the new and actual town of Simijaca was established. It was formed by indigenous people from Simijaca, Fúquene and Nemoguá.

Economy 
Main economical activity in Simijaca is agriculture with products onions, beans, maize, potatoes, milk and peas as most important agricultural products.

Geology 
The Upper Cretaceous Simijaca Formation is named after Simijaca.

Communications 
Simijaca has its own TV Station, ACOTV, which is available through analogue cable.

The High School, IED Agustín Parra, has a FM radio station on 97.7MHz that is also available online. The (SHOUTcast) stream's URL is http://46.105.115.146:8286/

Gallery

References

Bibliography 
 
 

Municipalities of Cundinamarca Department
Populated places established in 1600
1600 establishments in the Spanish Empire
Muisca Confederation
Muysccubun